Yahweh is a reconstruction of the name of the God mentioned in the Hebrew Bible.

More specific articles
 The Tetragrammaton, the four Hebrew letters YHWH, which is believed to have been vocalized as "Yahweh".

Religion
 Assemblies of Yahweh, an international religious group based in Bethel, Pennsylvania that uses the Sacred Names Yahweh (God) and Yahshua (Jesus)
 House of Yahweh, an American religious group based in Abilene, Texas
 Nation of Yahweh, a black American religious group founded by Yahweh ben Yahweh
Yahweh ben Yahweh (Hulon Mitchell Jr., 1935–2007), founder and leader of the Nation of Yahweh
 Sacred Name Movement, a Christian movement emphasizing use of "Yahweh"
 Yahweh, the extraterrestrial Elohim scientist responsible for creating humanity in the atheistic religion known as Raëlism

Music
 Yahweh (album), a 2010 album by Hillsong Church, or the title song
 "Yahweh" (song), a 2004 song by U2

See also
 Jehovah (disambiguation)
 Tetragrammaton (disambiguation)